View of Haarlem with Bleaching Fields (c. 1670–1675) is an oil on canvas painting by Dutch painter Jacob van Ruisdael.
It is an example of Dutch Golden Age painting and is now in the collection of the Kunsthaus Zürich.

This painting was documented by Hofstede de Groot in 1911, who wrote; "92. The Haarlem Bleaching-Grounds. In the left foreground is a marshy pool surrounded with trees. A road leads from it up a hill towards the right background. In the middle distance is part of the bleaching-grounds; large pieces of linen are spread out near cottages, and many persons are at work. In the distance is the town of Haarlem, dominated by the church of St. Bavo. The sky is filled with great masses of cloud which overshadow almost the whole landscape; stray sunbeams illumine part of the town and the bleaching-grounds. Portrayed in the scene, the linen and beer brewing industries were the most important industries in seventeenth century Haarlem. Signed in full in the left-hand bottom corner; canvas, 24.5 inches by 21.7 inches. Exhibited at Düsseldorf, 1886, No. 288. Sale. Count Sierstorpff, Berlin, April 19, 1887, No. 67.

Other versions
This scene is very similar to other panorama paintings Ruisdael made in this period and these Haerlempjes often served as inspiration for later painters of landscape, such as Jacob Maris of the Hague School.

In Popular Culture 
In his 1995 book The Rings of Saturn, W.G. Sebald describes and discusses the painting in detail in an anecdote about his visit to the Mauritshuis.

References

 Volume IV translated from the German original. A catalogue raisonné of the works of the most eminent Dutch painters of the seventeenth century based on the work of John Smith. Translation in English and edited by Edward G. Hawke and assisted by Kurt Freise by Hofstede de Groot, Cornelis, 1863-1930; Smith, John, dealer in pictures, London, 1912
View of Haarlem with bleaching field in the foreground, ca.1670-1675 in the RKD

1670s paintings
Paintings by Jacob van Ruisdael
Paintings in the collection of the Kunsthaus Zürich
Churches in art
Water in art
Landscape paintings